Lemyra jeremyi is a moth of the family Erebidae. It was described by Thomas in 1990. It is found on Sulawesi.

References

 

jeremyi
Moths described in 1990